Living Black is a current affairs program aired on SBS, Australia, addressed primarily to the interests of Australia's indigenous community. Karla Grant has been executive producer of this program, which she developed, since 2002. She has also been fronting the show since 2004.

Programming
In 2010, the show aired on SBS TV with one or two repeats airing during daytime programming during the week on SBS Viceland.

From 2013 the show screened on SBS and was repeated at a later time on National Indigenous Television (NITV) each week. From 2017, the show screened initially on NITV and was repeated at a later time on SBS. Over the years, in the Asia Pacific region, it has also aired on the ABC Australia.

References

External links
Living Black-2003 at the National Film and Sound Archive
Living Black-2005 at the National Film and Sound Archive
Living Black-2006 at the National Film and Sound Archive

External links
Program Home Page at SBS

Australian television news shows
Special Broadcasting Service original programming
2003 Australian television series debuts
2010s Australian television series
Indigenous Australian television series